Kola Shaler is a cola soft drink manufactured in Nicaragua, invented by David Robleto Alemán in 1904. Today the drink is manufactured in Managua by Kola Shaler Industrial SA. Kola Shaler has been described as "one of the pioneering companies in Nicaraguan industry" due to its longevity and continued popularity.

History 
Kola Shaler was first produced in 1904 by David Robleto Alemán, in his native city of León, Nicaragua. Robleto Alemán came up with the name "Shaler" to sound like popular soft drinks of the time, many of which had English or German names. He thought that a brand with a Spanish name couldn't compete with drinks with English or German names.

In 1925, Kola Shaler moved production to Managua, the country's capital. The original Managua factory withstood one earthquake, in 1931, before being ultimately destroyed in the 1972 Nicaraguan earthquake, which leveled an estimated 70% of the city. 

After the earthquake, Aurora Robleto de Cárdenas, the daughter of the factory's founder, Robleto Alemán, worked with her husband to save the machines that weren't damaged and set up a new factory in the eastern part of Managua, where it is still running as of 2022. 

In July 2022, the Kola Shaler factory was recognized as a historic business by Reyna Rueda, the Mayor of Managua.

Kola Shaler ingredients are imported from England. As of 2004, the drink's recipe had not changed since its inception.

Cultural impact 
In 2004, the brand celebrated its 100-year anniversary. Popular Nicaraguan newspaper La Prensa published a retrospective of the brand to commemorate the occasion, noting that during its production history, Kola Shaler had weathered "two earthquakes, an armed conflict, and the fierce competition of the transnational soft drink business."

Critics have attributed the brand's continued success to nostalgia and brand loyalty, especially among expatriate populations in Florida and California.

It has been called "the other national drink of Nicaragua, after pinol and pinolillo."

External links
 Kola Shaler official website

References 

Companies of Nicaragua
Cola brands
Nicaraguan brands
Soft drinks
Nicaraguan cuisine